Dymchurch Martello Tower is a Martello tower in Dymchurch, Kent England. It stands immediately behind the sea wall.

It has been designated by English Heritage as a scheduled monument and a Grade II listed building.

The towers, ranging along the Kent and East Sussex shoreline, were built in the early years of the nineteenth century as part of a coastal defence programme against a threatened French invasion under Napoleon. The 24th of 75 such towers, it was placed to protect the gates of marsh sluices with its counterpart Tower no 25 (which is now largely derelict).

Tower 23 was restored externally in the early 1970s and is currently a private residence. Tower 24 was then restored using Tower 23 as a guide. In 1969, it became the first Martello tower to be opened to the public and remains as a museum of the Martello Towers, owned by English Heritage.
It has a 24-pounder muzzle-loading cannon on the gun platform.

The Friends of Martello24 act as custodians of the tower on behalf of English Heritage and manage its openings to the public, both on a regular basis and bespoke visits. The tower is open every Saturday, Sunday and bank holiday from 2 pm to 4 pm, Easter to October.

References

External links
 Dymchurch Martello Tower – English Heritage
 Dymchurch Martello Tower – Romney Marsh website
 Friends of Martello24 – Dymchurch

Grade II listed buildings in Kent
History museums in Kent
English Heritage sites in Kent
Military and war museums in England
Martello towers